"You're Moving Out Today" is a song written by Carole Bayer Sager, Bette Midler and Bruce Roberts. It became an international hit in 1977, in two versions.

Both Sager and Midler recorded the song. The first U.S. release was by Bette Midler, in February 1977. It was the lead single from her LP Live at Last. Her version reached No. 42 on the Billboard Hot 100, and also charted in Canada. On the adult contemporary charts, the song reached No. 11 in the U.S. and No. 9 in Canada.

Carole Bayer Sager version
"You're Moving Out Today" became an international hit for Carole Bayer Sager during the fall of the year, reaching number six in the UK and spending four weeks at number one in Australia.

Although Sager is a prolific songwriter who is credited on many hit singles, this was the first one that she performed herself.

Chart history

Weekly charts

Year-end charts

References

External links
 
 

1976 songs
1977 singles
Bette Midler songs
Number-one singles in Australia
Songs written by Bruce Roberts (singer)
Songs written by Carole Bayer Sager
Atlantic Records singles
Elektra Records singles